In Boolean algebra, the consensus theorem or rule of consensus is the identity:

It is the conjunction of all the unique literals of the terms, excluding the literal that appears unnegated in one term and negated in the other.

The conjunctive dual of this equation is:

Proof

Consensus

The consensus or consensus term of two conjunctive terms of a disjunction is defined when one term contains the literal  and the other the literal , an opposition. The consensus is undefined if there is more than one opposition.

This shows that the LHS is derivable from the RHS (if A → B then A → AB; replacing A with RHS and B with (y ∨ z) ). The RHS can be derived from the LHS simply through the conjunction elimination inference rule. Since RHS → LHS and LHS → RHS (in propositional calculus), then LHS = RHS (in Boolean algebra).

Applications
In Boolean algebra, repeated consensus is the core of one algorithm for calculating the Blake canonical form of a formula.

In digital logic, including the consensus term in a circuit can eliminate race hazards.

History
The concept of consensus was introduced by Archie Blake in 1937, related to the Blake canonical form. It was rediscovered by Samson and Mills in 1954 and by Quine in 1955. Quine coined the term 'consensus'. Robinson used it for clauses in 1965 as the basis of his "resolution principle".

References

Further reading
 Roth, Charles H. Jr. and Kinney, Larry L. (2004, 2010). "Fundamentals of Logic Design", 6th Ed., p. 66ff.

Boolean algebra
Theorems in lattice theory
Theorems in propositional logic